Zellerite is a uranium mineral, named after its discoverer, geologist Howard Davis Zeller. It has a type locality of the Lucky MC uranium mine in Wyoming, USA. It was approved by the IMA in 1965, but was first published a year after its approval.

Properties 
Zellerite is a dimorph of meyrowitzite. It is a uranyl carbonate. It is an acicular mineral, and occurs in crystals that resemble the shape of needles. It can occur as fine hairlike fibers as well. The size of each crystal is up to 2 mm, and it grows in roughly radial aggregates, veinlets, and incrustations. Elongation is possible.  It has pleochroic attributes, which is an optical phenomenon. Depending on which axis the specimen is being inspected, it can occur as it changes color. Upon being inspected on the x or y axis, the mineral can seem to be colorless, but on the z axis, it is seen in a pale yellow color. The mineral also shows luminescence. Under both a short wave and a long wave ultraviolet light, it fluoresces in green patches. That is due to the mineral's very strong radioactive properties, more accurately due to the high uranium concentration in it. Furthermore, measured in GRapi units, zellerite has a very strong, 3,568,854.57 radioactivity. The concentration of the mineral per Gamma Ray American Petroleum Institute Units is 280.20. As for the mineral being highly radioactive, it is due to zellerite mainly consisting of oxidized uranium, where the concentration of uranium is 45.76%, while that of oxygen is 39.98%. Otherwise, it consists of calcium (7.70%), carbon (4.62%) and hydrogen (1.94%). The fully hydrated form of the mineral is lemon yellow, but in transmitted light, it has a very pale yellow color. The dehydrated version of the mineral is called metazellerite. This rare mineral forms in the weathering zone as an oxidation product of uraninite-coffinite, in the presence of an oxidizing pyrite, where the pH is greater than 7 and the partial pressure of carbon dioxide is greater than the atmosphere's. It is associated with metazellerite, gypsum, uranophane, meta-autunite, schoepite, iron sulfides, limonite and opal.

References

Carbonate minerals
Monoclinic minerals
Uranium minerals